Ebenezer Dam is an earth-fill type dam on the Groot Letaba River, near Tzaneen, Limpopo, South Africa. The Broederstroom also flows into the dam. It was established in 1959 and its primary purpose is for municipal and industrial usage. The dam's hazard potential has been ranked to be high.

See also
List of reservoirs and dams in South Africa
List of rivers of South Africa

References 

 List of South African Dams from the Department of Water Affairs and Forestry (South Africa)

Dams in South Africa
Dams completed in 1959